Lezlye W. Zupkus (born July 2, 1966) is a Republican member of the Connecticut House of Representatives. She represents the 89th District, serving portions of Bethany, Cheshire, and all of Prospect.

About

Born in Lambert, Mississippi, Lezlye moved to Prospect with her husband in 1993, and she has two children. Zupkus has always had an active role within the community, and was the commissioner of the Prospect Planning and Zoning board from 1998 to 2000. She is now serving her second term as representative, after defeating the incumbent candidate, Vickie Nardello.

Zupkus is a graduate of Embry-Riddle Aeronautical University in Daytona Beach, Florida.

References

1966 births
Connecticut Republicans
Women state legislators in Connecticut
People from Lambert, Mississippi
People from Prospect, Connecticut
Embry–Riddle Aeronautical University alumni
Living people
21st-century American politicians
21st-century American women politicians
20th-century American politicians
20th-century American women politicians